Normando Macalinao is a Filipino magician, known as Normando the Magician.

Early life and education 
Normando grew up in a small town called Aliaga province of Nueva Ecija in the Philippines.  He graduated in Bachelor of Science in Hotel and Restaurant Management from La Fortuna College.

Career 
Normando's passion for magic was sparked as young 14 year old boy when he was 'blown away' by a local performer who transformed one red ball into two. Thereafter he continued to develop and practise his magic as a young adult. In 2014, Normando moved to Dubai where he secured work as a hotel waiter and continued to share his magic with guests. Through sharing his talents at the hotel, Normando was scouted by a local talent agency. He quit his job and was soon performing in the most elite venues in Dubai.

Normando has been working as a professional magician for more than two years and now works independently with his own client base.  He has performed at exclusive events in Saudi Arabia, Zanzibar and the Maldives.

Recognitions 
 300 Most Influential Filipino in the Gulf
 Featured in billboard in Dubai

References

External links
 

Living people
Filipino magicians
Emirati magicians